Jean Antoine Dours (22 March 1824 in Bagnères de Bigorre – 29 July 1874 in Amiens) was a French entomologist specialising in Hymenoptera.

Works
 Essai de topograhie médicale sur Daya, province d'Oran (Dissertation)
 Catalogue raisonné des hyménoptères du département de la Somme., Amiens: Mellifères 1861
 Monographie iconographique du genre Anthophora Latreille, Mémoires de la Societé Linnéene de Nord de la France, 2, Amiens 1869
 Hyménoptères nouveaux du bassin méditerranéen. Revue et Magasin de Zoologie (2)23, p. 293 -. 312, 349 - 359, 396 - 399, 418 - 434 (1872)
 Catalogue synonymique des Hyménoptères de France. Mémoires de la Societé Linnéene de Nord de la France (Amiens), 3, 1-230.(1873) See https://archive.org/details/ants_14701 for pages on ants

Collection
Excepting the material he acquired from Joseph-Étienne Giraud which was returned to that entomologist, Dours collection was burned in a fire in the U.S.A.

References
 Alex Laboulbène (1874): Notices nécrologique sur le docteur Antoine Dours, in: Annales de la Société Entomologique de France, Vol. 43, p. 351-358
 Lhoste, J. (1987): Les entomologistes français. 1750 - 1950. - INRA (Institut National de la Recherche Agronomique), Paris : 1-355

French entomologists
Hymenopterists
1824 births
1874 deaths